Lily Francesca Plummer-Frazer (born 17 September 1988) is an English actress. She was nominated for a WhatsOnStage Award for her performance in the West End production of In the Heights. On television, she is known for her roles in the iPlayer series Ladhood (2019–2022) and the period drama Hotel Portofino (2022–).

Early life
Frazer is from the Nuneaton and Bedworth area of Warwickshire. She took classes at the Wendy Morton Academy of Dance in Atherstone. She went on to pursue a Bachelor of Arts in Musical Theatre at Arts Educational School in London.

Career
After leaving ArtsEd, Frazer was cast in her first West End production, joining the ensemble of the long-running musical Les Misérables at the Queen's Theatre. She was also the second cover for Éponine and took part in the Les Mis Gives… at Christmas cabaret. She workshopped Viva Forever! , the Spice Girls musical. She then joined the ensemble of Jesus Christ Superstar for its arena tour. She went on to star as Demeter in the Bristol Hippodrome production of Cats.

Frazer starred as Nina Rosario in the 2015 West End production of Lin-Manuel Miranda's In the Heights. For her performance, she was nominated for Best Actress in a Musical at the 2016 WhatsOnStage Awards. The following year, she played Michelle Morris in the Dreamgirls revival at the Savoy Theatre.

Frazer appeared in Rose Glass' 2019 horror film Saint Maud. That same year, she joined the main cast of the sitcom Cuckoo for its fifth and final series. She began starring as Jess, the lead character's (Liam Williams) girlfriend, in the BBC iPlayer series Ladhood. She played American guest Claudine Pascal in the 2022 period drama Hotel Portofino.

Personal life
Frazer has taught at Vision Theatre Arts, a children's performing arts programme in Biggleswade. She married Adam Pritchard at Royle Forest on 1 October 2022, having been in a relationship for over ten years. The couple have a daughter (b. 2019).

Filmography

Film

Television

Web

Music videos

Stage

Awards and nominations

References

External links
 

Living people
1988 births
Actresses from Warwickshire
Black British actresses
English musical theatre actresses
People educated at the Arts Educational Schools
People from Nuneaton and Bedworth (district)